Vladimir Ivanovich Kosinsky (26 February 1945 – 14 July 2011) was a Soviet swimmer. Over his career he won two silver and one bronze Olympic medals for the Soviet Union. He was born in Kotlas, Arkhangelsk Oblast, Russia.

See also
World record progression 200 metres breaststroke

References

External links
 
Vladimir Kosinsky's obituary 

Russian male swimmers
Olympic silver medalists for the Soviet Union
Olympic bronze medalists for the Soviet Union
Swimmers at the 1964 Summer Olympics
Swimmers at the 1968 Summer Olympics
Swimmers at the 1972 Summer Olympics
1945 births
2011 deaths
World record setters in swimming
Olympic bronze medalists in swimming
Medalists at the 1968 Summer Olympics
People from Kotlas
Olympic silver medalists in swimming
Olympic swimmers of the Soviet Union
Soviet male swimmers
Sportspeople from Arkhangelsk Oblast